In computer networking, Photuris is a session key management protocol defined in RFC 2522.

Photuris is the Latin name of a genus of fireflies native to North America that mimic the signals of other firefly species. The name was chosen as a reference to the (classified) FIREFLY key exchange protocol developed by the National Security Agency and used in the STU-III secure telephone, which is believed to operate by similar principles.

See also
FIREFLY

External links
 RFC 2522
 Test implementation of Photuris

Network protocols